Under the Whyte notation for the classification of steam locomotives by wheel arrangement,  is an articulated locomotive, usually of the Garratt type. The wheel arrangement is effectively two  locomotives operating back to back, with the boiler and cab suspended between the two power units. Each power unit has two leading wheels on one axle, four powered and coupled driving wheels on two axles and no trailing wheels. Since the  type is sometimes known as a Porter, the corresponding Garratt type would be referred to as a Double Porter. A similar wheel arrangement exists for Mallet locomotives, but is referred to as 2-4-4-2.

Overview
This was the second rarest Garratt wheel arrangement. Only five locomotives were constructed to this arrangement, four of which were built by Beyer, Peacock and Company (BP).

The four BP locomotives comprised three for the  São Paulo Railway of Brazil in 1915, and one for the  gauge Ceylon Government Railway (CGR) in 1929, the CGR's class H1.

Usage

Brazil

Ceylon
The single class H1 Garratt entered service on the Ceylon Government Railways in 1931. It was used in mixed traffic working on the Uda Pussellawa railway. Until the 1960s, the locomotive was occasionally operated on the Kelani Valley Line. It was withdrawn from service in 1972 and was scrapped in 1981.

References

 
 
4,2-4-0
44,2-4-0+0-4-2